This article describes national internet structures in Central Asia which are referred to as freenet. A separate article describes the decentralized censorship-resistant peer-to-peer file sharing software known as Freenet. There is also a text-based community computer network which offers limited Internet services, at little or no cost, and is known as a "freenet."

Several Internet networks in Central Asia, specifically, Kazakhstan, Kyrgyzstan and Uzbekistan are financed by USAID and other United States governmental authorities and are called Freenet. In contrast with the decentralized censorship-resistant peer-to-peer file sharing software called Freenet, which is specifically designed to be very censorship-resistant, and in fact, to increase distribution of information in the case of censorship attempts, there is little information regarding the independence of the Central Asian networks from censorship by the operating authorities.

These freenets were started in 1996 as part of a United States Information Agency (USIA) project known as the Internet Access and Training Program IATP. The IATP was administered by the International Research & Exchanges Board (IREX) and funded by the Freedom Support Act (FSA). The objective of the IATP was to assist universities in accessing and developing Internet resources. This included the development of infrastructure such as satellite connectivity, local area networks, dial up access, and computer labs. Further the project trained staff and students in the use of email and the web to support research and communication with peers outside of Central Asia.

The IATP in Uzbekistan was the first to use the name "freenet". As the project in Uzbekistan developed, dial up access was provided to regional non governmental organizations (NGOs) who in turn provided support to the project that allowed students and staff at universities to enjoy free Internet access. This is where the concept of a "free" network originated. The Uzbekistan freenet was started by the IATP Regional Coordinator Christopher Parker along with Alexei Vostrikov and Boris Miller. The University of World Economy and Diplomacy (UWED) and the Tashkent State University of Economics (TSUE) were the first universities in Uzbekistan to have always on Internet access. This was achieved using microwave links that connected both universities to a shared VSAT link.  

Another Internet network, initiated by the UNDP, including support from USAID, was started in Armenia in 1997 and is also called Freenet. , users of Freenet in Armenia cannot access web pages on servers outside of Armenia. Apart from this restriction on website access, the degree of censorship on Freenet in Armenia is unknown.

External links
Freenet (USAID sponsored) in Kazakhstan
Freenet (USAID sponsored) in Kyrgyzstan
Freenet (USAID sponsored) in Uzbekistan
Freenet (UNDP initiated) in Armenia
document by UNDP

Central Asia
United States Agency for International Development
Internet in Kazakhstan
Internet in Kyrgyzstan